Mario Nenadić (born 25 March 1964) is a Bosnian politician who served as Prime Minister of Sarajevo Canton from 2020 to 2021. He is a member of the Union for a Better Future of BiH.

Early life and education
Nenadić was born in Sarajevo, SR Bosnia and Herzegovina, SFR Yugoslavia on 25 March 1964. He graduated from the Faculty of Law at the University of Sarajevo.

Career
Nenadić was a long-term employee of the Bosnian Ministry of Human Rights and Refugees. He then worked at the Ministry of Civil Affairs and Communication from 1998 to 2000. After that, he became an assistant to the Minister of Human Rights and Refugees.

Nenadić later worked at the Bosnian Agency for Statistics, then again as an assistant to the Minister of Human Rights and Refugees and later as the Cantonal Minister of Justice and Administration from 2015 until 2018.

On 5 February 2020, he was chosen to serve as Prime Minister of Sarajevo Canton, as part of a three-party coalition which included the Union for a Better Future of BiH, the party which Nenadić is a part of. He officially became Prime Minister on 3 March 2020. Nenadić served as Prime Minister until 5 January 2021, after which he was succeeded by Edin Forto, following the 2020 municipal elections and a lacklustre showing of the three-party coalition.

Personal life
Nenadić lives in Sarajevo with his wife. Apart from his native Bosnian, Nenadić also speaks English.

On 7 August 2020, he suffered a mild stroke. Six days later, on 13 August, Nenadić was released from hospital. On 3 November 2020, it was confirmed that he tested positive for COVID-19, amid its pandemic in Bosnia and Herzegovina.

References

External links
Biografija - Mario Nenadić at scribd.com

1964 births
Living people
Politicians from Sarajevo
Croats of Bosnia and Herzegovina
Sarajevo Law School alumni
Army of the Republic of Bosnia and Herzegovina soldiers
Bosnia and Herzegovina politicians
Union for a Better Future of BiH politicians